Toanopsis is a genus of moths of the family Noctuidae. The genus was erected by A. E. Prout in 1926.

Species
Toanopsis cyclophora Holloway, 2009 Borneo
Toanopsis engenes A. E. Prout, 1926 Borneo
Toanopsis homala (A. E. Prout, 1925) Peninsular Malaysia, Borneo
Toanopsis ichingae Holloway, 2009 Borneo
Toanopsis particolor (Warren, 1913) Peninsular Malaysia, Borneo, Bali, Java

References

Acontiinae